Bernard Marti (born 16 April 1943 in Paris) is a Swiss orienteering competitor. He received a silver medal in the relay event at the 1972 World Orienteering Championships in Jičín, together with Dieter Hulliger, Dieter Wolf and Karl John.

References

1943 births
Living people
Swiss orienteers
Male orienteers
Foot orienteers
World Orienteering Championships medalists
20th-century Swiss people